Screwy Squirrel (also known as Screwball Squirrel) is an animated cartoon character, an anthropomorphic squirrel created by Tex Avery for Metro-Goldwyn-Mayer. He is generally considered the wackiest and outright most antagonistic of the screwball cartoon characters of the 1940s.

Among the most outrageous cartoon characters ever created, Screwy can do almost anything to almost anyone: he pulls objects out of thin air, doubles himself, and constantly breaks the fourth wall, all the while uttering a characteristic cackling laugh. The character was not as successful as Avery's Droopy was at this time, and Screwy appeared in only five cartoons: Screwball Squirrel (1944), Happy-Go-Nutty (1944), Big Heel-Watha (1944), The Screwy Truant (1945), and Lonesome Lenny (1946).

Biography 
The character was known for being brash and erratic, with few sympathetic personality characteristics such as Bugs Bunny's nobility and Daffy Duck's pathos. (Both of these characters also being creations of Tex Avery)  Most of his cartoons saw him paired with Meathead Dog (voiced by screenwriter Cal Howard in Screwball Squirrel, Tex Avery in Happy-Go-Nutty and Pinto Colvig in The Screwy Truant) as his adversary. Meathead's physical appearance differed in between the three shorts in which he appeared (with his ears changing color from grey-blue to black in Happy-Go-Nutty, and donning a new color palette in The Screwy Truant), but otherwise the character remained the same.

Screwy's shorts revolved around him inflicting various forms of torture on Meathead – or another enemy – for seven minutes. In The Screwy Truant, one gag sees Screwy hitting Meathead over the head with everything he can find in a trunk labeled "Assorted Swell Stuff to Hit Dog on Head". When he finishes, Meathead remarks, "Gee whiz! He hit me with everything but the kitchen sink!" Screwy responds with, "Well, don't want to disappoint you, chum," then pulls out that very item and bashes him over the head with it.

The final cartoon in the series, Lonesome Lenny (a broad parody of the characters of George and Lenny from the John Steinbeck novel Of Mice and Men), ends with a scene indicating that Screwy has been killed off as a regular MGM character. The 1946 cartoon begins with a wealthy woman purchasing the squirrel at a pet shop with the intention of giving him to her large dog Lenny as a companion. Pampered and dim-witted, Lenny is unaware of his brute strength; and later, when he hugs Screwy, he accidentally crushes him to death. In the cartoon's closing scene, the dog is now all alone and lying on the floor in his owner's mansion. After casually squeezing and pulverizing a big chew bone with his paw and crumpling his metal food bowl, he sits up, turns to the audience, and says, "You know, I had a little friend once, but he don't move no more." Lenny then reaches into a side "pocket" in his fur and pulls out the flattened body of Screwy. The squirrel is motionless and his eyes are closed. Seemingly dead, Screwy suddenly opens one eye and brings a sign out from behind his back that reads, "SAD ENDING, isn't it?" That gesture cast some doubt at the time on the finality of the crazy squirrel's demise. A similar "death" gag is presented at the conclusion of the 1957 Warner Bros. cartoon What's Opera Doc?, which was directed by Chuck Jones. In that cartoon, however, as a dead Bugs Bunny is being carried away by a guilt-ridden Elmer Fudd, the rabbit awakes to speak to the audience about the opera parody's sad ending.

It is said that the reason why Screwy was killed off in his last cartoon was because Tex Avery grew to openly dislike the character. According to animator Mark Kausler, he used to send Avery letters about his rendition of Screwy. He later learns that Avery has thrown away anything related to the character. Kausler would also say, “Tex really hated Screwy, because he didn't catch on like "the rabbit".

Later Appearances 
Meathead Dog makes a cameo appearance in the 1988 film Who Framed Roger Rabbit. He is seen sniffing around at R. K. Maroon's Cartoon Studio in the film's beginning. Screwy is mockingly mentioned by one of Eddie Valiant's bar patrons Angelo: "Who's your client, Mr. Detective of the Stars? Chilly Willy, or Screwy Squirrel?"

In 1993, Hanna-Barbera resurrected Screwy in new animation for the series Droopy, Master Detective as part of Fox Kids' programming block of Saturday morning cartoons. Those new cartoons featured the character's name as Screwballnever Screwyand pitted him not against Meathead but against a pair of typical Hanna-Barbera authority figures, a human park attendant named Dweeble and his oafish dog Rumply. "Screwball" himself wore a T-shirt and often a "Napoleon-style" bicorne hat.

On April Fools' Day in 1997, Cartoon Network broadcast an edited version (minus one blackface gag) of the 1944 Screwy Squirrel cartoon Happy-Go-Nutty repeatedly from 6 AM to 6 PM, as part of an April Fool's joke that the cartoon character had seized control of the network.

On April Fool's Day in 2012, Cartoon Network broadcast Screwy Squirrel's debut cartoon The Screwball Squirrel, at 6:00 am and 11:45 am respectively, which marked the first time that a cartoon by Tex Avery was broadcast on the network since The Tex Avery Show.

In 2013, both Meathead and Screwy Squirrel make appearances as residents of "Fairy Land" in Tom and Jerry's Giant Adventure retaining most of their traits. Screwy Squirrel was voiced by Paul Reubens and Meathead is voiced by John DiMaggio.

In 2019, Screwy Squirrel makes an appearance as a landlord of an apartment building called Screwy Arms Apartments, in the third season of The Tom and Jerry Show episode called "Double Dog Trouble". He also makes various cameos in the series. Screwy is voiced by Sean Kenin.

American animator and producer Bruce W. Smith briefly began developing a series for Warner Bros. starring the titular character. In Smith's proposed storyline, which was never produced, Screwy thinks he is in Hollywood, California, but in reality he is in Hollywood, Alabama.

Voice actors
 Wally Maher (1944—1946)
 Pinto Colvig (laughing in The Screwy Truant)
 Charlie Adler (Droopy, Master Detective)
 Jeff Bergman (Boomerang bumpers)
 Paul Reubens (Tom and Jerry's Giant Adventure)
 Sean Kenin (The Tom and Jerry Show)

Cartoons

Comics

List of comics appearances 
 Our Gang Comics #12–14 (1944) (Dell Comics)
 Tom & Jerry's Winter Carnival #1 (1952), #2 (1953) (Dell)
 Tom & Jerry's Winter Fun #3 (1954), #6 (1957), #7 (1958), #8 (1958) (Dell)
 Tom & Jerry's Summer Fun #1 (1954), #2 (1955) (Dell)
 Tom and Jerry #213 (1962), #231, #232 (1966), #258 (1971)
 Golden Comics Digest #3, #5 (1969), #8 (1970), #18 (1971), #22, #25 (1972), #28 (1973), #41 (1975) (Gold Key Comics)
 Tex Avery's Wolf and Red various issues (1995) (Dark Horse Comics)
 Tex Avery's Screwball Squirrel (1995) (Dark Horse Comics)
 Tex Avery's Droopy various issues (1995) (Dark Horse Comics)
 Comics and Stories various issues (1996) (Dark Horse Comics)

Some earlier comics style the character's name as "Skrewy Squirrel" or "Skrewy the Screwball Squirrel." Additional titles, not listed here, include the character in one-page gag or puzzle features.

Home media
Several Screwy Squirrel cartoons were released as bonus features on classic Warner Bros. titles including:
 Screwball Squirrel on the DVD of The Thin Man Goes Home
 Happy-Go-Nutty on the DVD of Dragon Seed
 The Screwy Truant on the DVD of The Clock (1945 film)
 Lonesome Lenny on the DVD of Undercurrent
 Screwball Squirrel on the Blu-Ray of Looney Tunes Platinum Collection: Volume 2 (Disc 3)

In March 2020, Screwball Squirrel, The Screwy Traunt, Big Heel-Watha and Lonesome Lenny were released on Blu-Ray, fully restored and uncut, by Warner Archive as part of Tex Avery Screwball Classics: Volume 1. Happy Go Nutty was released on October 5, 2021 as part of Tex Avery Screwball Classics: Volume 3- completing Screwy’s filmography.

Other appearances
A voice clip of Wally Maher as Screwy Squirrel from the character's debut short was recycled for the character of Dweezil the cat in the video game Putty.

References

External links
 Screwball Squirrel at the Big Cartoon DataBase.
 Screwy Squirrel at Don Markstein's Toonopedia. Archived from the original on March 29, 2017.

Tex Avery
Animated film series
Animated characters
Fictional squirrels
MGM cartoon characters
Film characters introduced in 1944
Film series introduced in 1944
Fictional anthropomorphic characters
Fictional characters who break the fourth wall
Fictional tricksters
Metro-Goldwyn-Mayer animated short films
Male characters in animation
Surreal comedy films
Metro-Goldwyn-Mayer cartoon studio film series